Hoogstraalacarus is a genus of mites in the family Acaridae.

Species
 Hoogstraalacarus tiwiensis Yunker, 1970

References

Acaridae